Nik Zupančič (born October 3, 1968) is a former Slovenian ice hockey player.

References

External links

1968 births
Living people
Slovenian ice hockey forwards
Slovenian ice hockey coaches
Sportspeople from Ljubljana
Slovenian expatriate sportspeople in Austria
Slovenian expatriate sportspeople in Croatia
Slovenian expatriate sportspeople in Sweden
HDD Olimpija Ljubljana players
KHL Medveščak Zagreb players
VEU Feldkirch players
JYP Jyväskylä players
Timrå IK players
HK Acroni Jesenice players
EHC Lustenau players
Dornbirn Bulldogs players
Slovenia men's national ice hockey team coaches
Slovenian expatriate sportspeople in Finland
Expatriate ice hockey players in Croatia
Expatriate ice hockey players in Finland
Expatriate ice hockey players in Sweden
Expatriate ice hockey players in Austria
Slovenian expatriate ice hockey people